Electric is the fifth studio album, released in 2002, by American country music artist Jack Ingram. The only single released was, "One Thing" which failed to chart. In 2003 an EP titled Electric: Extra Volts was released which contained five songs left off this album.

Track listing

Personnel

Musicians
 Bukka Allen – keyboards
 Richard Bennett – acoustic guitar
 Bob Britt – acoustic guitar, electric guitar, background vocals
 Pete Coatney – drums, percussion
 Chad Cromwell – drums
 Eric Darken – percussion
 Chris Feinstein – bass guitar
 Paul Franklin – steel guitar
 Jon Dee Graham – acoustic guitar, electric guitar
 Kenny Greenberg – electric guitar
 Patty Griffin – background vocals
 David Grissom – electric guitar
 Rob Hajacos – fiddle
 Tommy Hannum – steel guitar, slide guitar
 John Hobbs – keyboards
 Peter Hyrka – fiddle
 Jack Ingram – acoustic guitar, electric guitar, percussion, lead vocals, background vocals
 Jay Joyce – acoustic guitar, bass guitar, electric guitar, keyboards, percussion, programming
 Tom Littlefield – acoustic guitar, background vocals
 Anthony Martin – background vocals
 Giles Reaves – percussion
 Bruce Robison – background vocals
 Lee Ann Womack – background vocals
 Glenn Worf – bass guitar

Technical
 Chuck Ainlay – mixing
 Chad Brown – assistant
 David Bryant – engineer, assistant
 Tony Castle – engineer
 Doug DeLong – assistant
 Michael Hiatt – A&R
 Patrick Himes – engineer
 Jay Joyce – engineer
 Beth Kindig – art direction, design
 Frank Liddell – producer
 Jim Lightman – engineer
 Mike McCarthy – producer, engineer, mixing
 Anthony Martin – A&R
 Frank Ockenfels – photography
 Kay Smith – A&R
 Glenn Spinner – assistant
 Hank Williams – mastering
 King Williams – engineer

Chart performance

References

2002 albums
Jack Ingram albums
Albums produced by Frank Liddell